Jan z  Sienna, also known as  John of Chotcza  was a 15th-century Polish noble, and soldier.

Family
Born in Sienno, he was son of Dobisław z Oleśnicy and Catherine Oleśnicka, daughter of  Dmitry of Goraj. Cardinal Zbigniew Oleśnicki was his uncle.
He had ten brothers and sisters, among them Jacob, who was Bishop of Kraków and then Archbishop of Gniezno and Primate of Poland. 
He left five sons, Dobiesława, Sigmund, Paul, Peter and John.

Career
He was Przemysl Chamberlain, Starost of Sandomierz, Castellan of Lwów, and Voivode of Ruthenia.

John or Jan distinguished himself fighting under Władysław II Jagiełło against Grand Master of the Teutonic Order, Świdrygiełłą and he received Świdrygielles Castle as a reward.

He was also the founder of the town Zolochiv(meaning Golden) in 1442 which is now in Ukraine. His family became one of the leading families in South-Eastern border region of the Polish–Lithuanian Commonwealth.

He died sometime before the year 1477.

See also
Jan z Sienna h. Dębno ''Geni.com

References

Diplomats of the Polish–Lithuanian Commonwealth
Polish nobility
Ruthenian nobility
Oleśnicki
15th-century deaths